Mary Ethel Creswell (October 15, 1879 – August 7, 1960) was the first female to receive an undergraduate degree from the University of Georgia (UGA) in Athens, Georgia.

In 1918, Creswell was appointed the head of the newly created Division of Home Economics for the University. The following year, she received a baccalaureate degree (B.S. in Home Economics) from the University.

In 1933, UGA established the College of Family and Consumer Sciences and Creswell was named as the first dean and served in that position until her retirement in 1945. She continued to teach in the college as a professor until 1949.

Creswell was a charter member of the Phi Kappa Phi honor society at UGA and its first female president, and she was the first female recipient of the Georgia Alumni Award for outstanding service to the University in 1949. Creswell died in Athens, Georgia on August 7, 1960. Creswell Hall, a dormitory that houses nearly a thousand students, is named in her honor.

References

UGA College of Family and Consumer Sciences Alumni Honor Hall of Recognition
UGA Creswell Community Housing
This Day in Georgia History: October 15, Ed Jackson and Charly Pou, Carl Vinson Institute of Government, The University of Georgia
Mary Ethel Creswell Papers 1900-1960, Hargrett Rare Book and Manuscript Library, University of Georgia

1879 births
1960 deaths
University of Georgia faculty
American women academics
University of Georgia alumni
20th-century American academics
Women deans (academic)
American university and college faculty deans